() is a multi-use stadium in Porthmadog, Wales.  It is currently used mostly for football matches as the home ground of Porthmadog F.C.  The stadium has a capacity of 2000 people, with 500 seated.
The Traeth saw its largest crowd in recent years during the season 1993/4, when the last game of the season against Bangor City F.C. attracted more than 2,500 spectators.

Planning permission was granted in December 2009 for a new stand at the "Quarry End". The additional seating will allow the club to reach the required standard in order to attain the FAW's Domestic Licence; this is a requirement for all clubs in the Welsh Premier League.

References

External links
 www.porthmadogfc.com

Football venues in Wales
Stadiums in Wales
Porthmadog F.C.